Elena Milashina (Russian: Милашина, Елена; born 1978) is a Russian investigative journalist for Novaya Gazeta. In October 2009, she was awarded Human Rights Watch's Alison Des Forges Award for Extraordinary Activism.

Biography
Elena Milashina was born on October 28, 1977 in the city of Dalnegorsk, Primorsky Krai. She studied at a school in the city of Amursk. In 1994–95, she took part in the FLEX exchange program; this helped her to further enter the Moscow State University.

In 1997, Milashina began working as a reporter and journalist for Novaya Gazeta, while studying at the same time. One of her mentors was Anna Politkovskaya. In 2000, Milashina published a series of materials on the Kursk nuclear submarine disaster, for which she received the Golden Pen of Russia award from the Journalists Union of Russia in the Journalistic Investigations category. In 2001 she graduated from the Faculty of Journalism of Moscow State University.

The areas of professional interest of Milashina include corruption, human rights violations in the North Caucasus and Chechnya, in particular, the investigation of the 2004 Beslan school siege, the 2006 assassination of Anna Politkovskaya, the 2008 conflict in South Ossetia, and the 2009 abduction and murder of Natalya Estemirova. In October 2009, Milashina became the laureate of the annual prize (Alison Des Forges Defender Award for Extraordinary Activism) of the international human rights organization Human Rights Watch.

She continues investigations started by her colleague Anna Politkovskaya, who was assassinated in Moscow in 2006, and her own independent investigations into occurrences in the North Caucasus.

She was a 2009-2010 Fellow of the University of Michigan Knight-Wallace Fellowship for Journalists in Ann Arbor, Michigan.

In the early morning of April 5, 2012, Milashina, along with her friend Ella Asoyan, was attacked by two unknown assailants in the Balashikha neighborhood of Moscow.

In 2013, Milashina was given an International Women of Courage Award.

While visiting Grozny, Chechnya on February 6, 2020, to attend a trial, Milashina and human rights lawyer Marina Dubrovina were attacked and beaten by unknown female assailants at the lobby of the Kontinental hotel.

Novaya Gazeta reported on February 8, 2022 that Milashina had been forced to leave Russia due to threats against her.

Awards 
 Free Media Awards 2016

References

External links

Milashina Speaks Out on Alarming Rise in Murders, Threats Against Critics of Government Abuses in North Caucasus - video report by Democracy Now!

1978 births
Living people
Women war correspondents
Russian journalists
Women in the Chechen wars
Russian women writers
Moscow State University alumni
Women human rights activists
Recipients of the International Women of Courage Award
Free Media Awards winners
Journalism as a Profession Awards winners
Redkollegia award winners